Jiaoying Summers (born January 18, 1990) is a comedian, SAG-AFTRA actress, producer, and philanthropist. She is best known for her TikTok videos and her focus on combating Asian racism and promoting Asian representation.

Early life and education 

Summers was born and raised in Henan Province in China. She was born during China's one-child policy, and her parents delivered her at home instead of a hospital "to avoid the shame of having a girl" as their only child. She came to the United States at the age of 18 and studied at the University of Kentucky.

Career 

In 2013, Summers served as the president for new business development for her family's construction company. She also interned for the IMAX Corporation in Los Angeles. In 2014, Summers won the title of Miss China in the international beauty pageant "Queen of the Universe". She began acting in 2016.

Summers is the founding partner and CEO of Summers Media, an international production company.

Comedy 

During an audition for the police drama show Rebel, executive producer John Singleton heard Summers making jokes and suggested that she "try her hand at comedy". Following his advice, she performed at her first open mic night in 2019. She began posting on TikTok in 2020, and has since gained more than 1.2 million followers and has accumulated over 1 billion views.

Summers incorporates personal material into her comedy routines, including her "decision to talk about [China's] one-child policy as a survivor". Her video went viral, leading to being banned on TikTok, which is owned by Chinese company ByteDance. TikTok cited violation of community guidelines, and restored her account three months later. Summers has spoken about continued deflated viewership, leading her to suspect she had also been shadow banned.

Summers performs regularly at The Laugh Factory, The Comedy Store, and Carolines NYC and was a headliner at the New York Comedy Festival in 2022. She also starred in the Netflix Is A Joke festival's Women in Comedy show. In 2022, Summers released a comedy special as part of the Comedy InvAsian series, on NBC Peacock.

Summers is the owner of two comedy clubs, both located in Los Angeles: The Hollywood Comedy and The Pasadena Comedy.

Philanthropy and outreach 

Summers is the Asia ambassador for Operation USA, a non profit humanitarian organization supporting health, education and relief programs. She is also the international ambassador for the Linzhou Charity Federation.

Honors and awards 

 In 2022, Summers was inducted into the Asian Hall of Fame

Filmography

As actress

As producer

Personal life 

Summers is a mother of two.

References

External links 

 
 
 
 

1990 births
21st-century American actresses
21st-century American comedians
American actresses of Chinese descent
American film actresses
American stand-up comedians
American women comedians
American women film producers
American women philanthropists
Comedians from California
Living people
TikTokers